The Philippine goat breed from the Philippines is used for the production of meat. 3.3 million goats were slaughtered for meat production there in 2018.

References

Sources
Philippine Goat

Goat breeds
Meat goat breeds
Goat breeds originating in the Philippines